Guerrilla Urbana (Urban Guerrilla in Spanish language) is a punk-rock group of the Canary Islands.

History
The group was formed in San Cristóbal de La Laguna (Tenerife) in 1983, sharing members with Eskorbuto Crónico, a pioneering punk-rock band in the Canary Islands dating back to the late 1970s. Gradually, the members of this group were integrated into Guerrilla Urbana as the original members were leaving the band until, in mid-1984, Eskorbuto Crónico was dissolved. Two years later "Cuervo", the drummer, was also brought into the band, the final member joining.

After numerous local performances, two tours in the Basque Country and several demos, Guerrilla Urbana recorded their first album, Razón de Estado, in 1989.

In 2012, Guerrilla Urbana released their tenth album, the first recorded live, called Serenata para antro y chusma Opus X.

Ideas
The majority of the lyrics of the group are either about social issues or on antireligious, antimilitaristic, antiauthoritarian, anti-fascist and anticolonialist themes. The group members are close to anarchist ideas.

Members
Cuervo: drums
David: bass guitar
Fredi: vocals
Zurda: guitar
Pachon: guitar

Discography
 Razón de Estado (1989)
 Toque a Degüello (1992)
 Palabra de Dios (1994)
 Spanish Diarrea (1996)
 Bestiario (2000)
 Guerrilla Urbana 1983–1993 (Compilation) (2000)
 La Venganza de los Pueblos (2002)
 Microcefalia (2006)
 Incendiario (2009)
 Guerrilla Urbana / Escorbuto Crónico (2011)
 Serenata para antro y chusma Opus X (Live) (2012)

References

Spanish punk rock groups